Darko Milinović (born 25 April 1963) is a Croatian politician and gynecologist who served as Minister of Health and Social Welfare from 2008 until 2011.

Biography

Milinović was born in Gospić. After graduating from the University of Zagreb School of Medicine in 1987, Milinović went on to specialise gynaecology, passing his specialty exam in 1996. He spent most of his professional career practicing in his home town of Gospić, and from 1998 to 2002 he held the post of the Gospić General Hospital director.

After joining the centre-right Croatian Democratic Union (HDZ) in the 1990s he obtained his first political post when he was appointed a member of the Gospić city council in 1998. In 2000 he was made member of the HDZ central committee and from 2000 to 2002 was head of HDZ in the city of Gospić. From 2002 to 2003 he held the office of deputy head of the Lika-Senj County. Following HDZ's victory in the 2003 parliamentary elections Milinović was elected to the Croatian Parliament. From 2003 to 2008 he held posts of Deputy Speaker of the Parliament and was a member of the parliamentary committee for family affairs, youth and sports.

After HDZ won the 2007 elections Milinović was appointed Minister of Health and Social Welfare in the new cabinet headed by Prime Minister Ivo Sanader on 12 January 2008, replacing Neven Ljubičić who had held the post from 2005 to 2008. Following Sanader's abrupt resignation on 1 July 2009, the cabinet was reconstructed and Milinovć retained his post in the new cabinet headed by Sanader's successor, Jadranka Kosor, which was officially announced on 6 July 2009.

Education and specialisation 

 2007. Degree of High business school Libertas: Supervision and corporate management for supervisory boards and governing counciles
 2005. Master's degree in gynecology „Minimalno agresivna terapija cervikalnih intraepitelnih neoplazija u cilju očuvanja fertilne sposobnosti žena“
 1996. Specialist gynecology and obstetrics exam
 1993. Course: „Health care system“, Ministry of Health
 1987. Degree, Faculty of medicine

Professional career 
 2002. – 2008. Re-elected for the director of General hospital, Gospić
 2000. Head of the gynaecological diseases and birth department, Gospić
 1998. – 2002. Director of general hospital, Gospić

Political career 
 2011. Croatian Parliament member, president of the Family, youth and sport committee, member of the Health and social care committee
 2009. – 2011. Vice-president of the Croatian Government, Minister of health and social care
 2009. – 2012. Deputy of the HDZ President
 2008. – 2009. Minister of health and social care
 2008. Re-elected for the president of Lika senj HDZ county committee and member of HDZ presidency
 2003. – 2008. Croatian Parliament member, Deputy president of Croatian parliament, member of the Family, youth and sport committee
 2003. Member of HDZ presidency, Clinical centre Rijeka governing council president, Plitvice lakes National park governing council president
 2002. – 2003. County perfect deputy and county government member
 2002. Lika-senj HDZ county committee president
 2000. – 2002. HDZ City council president, Gospić
 2000. HDZ presidency member
 1998. County government member, Gospić
 1989. HDZ member

Memberships 
 2001. Croatian league for fight against cancer, deputy president
 2001. Croatian league for fight against cancer, secretary of Lika senj county region
 1996. Patriotic war defenders association Gospić, president

Publications 
 Majerović M, Milinović D, Orešković S, Matošević P, Mirić M, Kekez T, Kinda E, Augustin G, Silovski H: Hyperthermic Intraperitoneal Chemotherapy (HIPEC) and Cytoreductive Surgery (CS) as Treatment of Peritoneal Carcinomatosis: Preliminary Results in Croatia“; Collegium Antropologicum 2011
 Segregur J, Buković D, Milinović D, Orešković S, Pavelić J, Zupić T, Persec J, Pavić M.: „Fetal Macrosomia in Pregnant Women With Gestational Diabetes“, Collegium Antropologicum 2009
 Milinović D, Kalafatić D, Babić D, Orešković LB, Grsic HL, Orešković S.: „Minimally Invasive Therapy Of Cervical Intraepithelial Neoplasia For Fertility Preservation“; Pathol Oncol Res. 2009
 Pesek K, Buković D, Pesek T, Oresković S, Milinović D, Rukavina M, Pavić M, Zlojtro M.: „Risk Factor Analysis And Diagnoses Of Coronary Heart Disease In Patients With Hypercholesterolemia From Croatian Zagorje County“; Collegium Antropologicum 2008
 Liječenje difuzne tireoze radioaktivnim jodom
 Milinović D, Kalafatic D, Babić D, Beketić-Orešković L, Orešković S.: „Minimally Invasive Therapy Of Cervical Intraepithelial Neoplasia For Fertility Preservation“, CEOC (Central European Oncology Congress), Croatia, Opatija, June 2007.
 Magistarski rad, Medicinski fakultet Sveučilišta u Zagrebu „Minimalno agresivna terapija cervikalnih intraepitelnih neoplazija u cilju očuvanja fertilne sposobnosti žena“, Zagreb, 2005.

Awards and medals 
 Medal „Oluja“ for participation in military action Oluja
 Patriotic war testimorial
 Croatian olympic committee – Lika-senj county sport union – award for the encouragement of sport development
 City Gospić – city development contribution plaquette

Hobby 
 Indoor soccer, skiing, music

References

External links 
Darko Milinović - official website
Darko Milinović profile at the Croatian Parliament official website 
Darko Milinović's curriculum vitae at the Croatian Democratic Union official website 

1963 births
Living people
People from Gospić
Representatives in the modern Croatian Parliament
Croatian Democratic Union politicians
School of Medicine, University of Zagreb alumni
Health ministers of Croatia
Croatian gynecologists